Robert Thompson Davis (August 28, 1823 – October 29, 1906) was an American physician and politician. He was a member of the United States House of Representatives from Massachusetts, and served as Mayor of Fall River from 1873 to 1874.

Biography
Robert T. Davis was born in County Down, Ireland on August 28, 1823. His family emigrated to the United States when he was three years old.

He graduated from Harvard Medical School in 1848, and practiced medicine in Waterville, Maine for three years, before moving to Fall River, Massachusetts.

He married Sarah C. Wilbur in 1848. She died in 1856, and he remarried to Susan A. Haight in 1862. They had one child.

Davis died at his home in Fall River on October 29, 1906. He is interred in Oak Grove Cemetery.

References

Mayors of Fall River, Massachusetts
People from County Down
Irish emigrants to the United States (before 1923)
1823 births
1906 deaths
Republican Party members of the United States House of Representatives from Massachusetts
19th-century American politicians
Harvard Medical School alumni